Tight Squeeze Hollow is a valley in the U.S. state of West Virginia.

Tight Squeeze Hollow was descriptively named for its narrow shape.

References

Landforms of Wood County, West Virginia
Valleys of West Virginia